Ivan Kožarić (10 June 1921, Petrinja – 15 November 2020, Zagreb) was a Croatian artist who worked primarily with sculpture but also in a wide variety of media, including: permanent and temporary sculptures, assemblages, proclamations, photographs, paintings, and installations. He lived and worked in Zagreb, Croatia.

His works are characterized by a sense of mischief, spontaneity and by his nonchalant approach to life. He was one of the founding members of the Gorgona Group, whose active members between 1959 and 1966 were Miljenko Horvat, Julije Knifer, Marijan Jevšovar, Dimitrije Bašičević (who also works under the name Mangelos), Matko Meštrović, Radoslav Putar, Đuro Seder and Josip Vaništa. During his period in Gorgona, his sculptures reduced in form, which would become the main characteristic of his later sculptural project consisting of numerous sculptures entitled the Feeling of Wholeness.

He had many solo exhibitions, both in Croatia and internationally. Some of the exhibitions were held at the Museum of Modern Art in Paris (2002) and at the Art Pavilion in Zagreb (2005–2006). He participated in many international group shows, including the Venice Biennale (1976), the São Paulo Biennale (1979), and documenta in Kassel (2002). The Museum of Contemporary Art, Zagreb bought his entire studio for display in the gallery in 2007. Commissioned by the Filip Trade Collection, he made Ascent, a slender sculpture more than 13 meters high (2002). He was the author of many public sculptures, including Landed Sun in Zagreb (1971), A. G. Matoš in Zagreb (1978), and Tree in Bochum (1979–1980). He received numerous awards, including the Vladimir Nazor Award for Life Achievement (1997).

Published works on Ivan Kožarić

 Maračić, Antun & Turković, Evelina, Studio Kožarić (Ideaimago, Zagreb, 1995).
 Župan, Ivica, Cheerful Sisyphus (Biblioteka Duchamp, Naklada MD, Zagreb, 1996).
 Koščević, Želimir, Kožarić (Naklada Naprijed d.d. Zagreb, 1996).
 Denegri, Jerko, Ivan Kožarić (Matica Hrvatska Sisak, Sisak, 2006.).
 Denegri, Jerko & Maroević, Tonko, Ivan Kožarić (exh. catalogue, Art Pavilion in Zagreb, Zagreb, 2006).

Notes and references

External links
 Ivan Kožarić at the Museum of Contemporary Art, Zagreb 
 Ivan Kožarić at the Croatian Academy of Sciences and Arts

Croatian sculptors
Croatian contemporary artists
1921 births
2020 deaths
Vladimir Nazor Award winners
People from Petrinja
Members of the Croatian Academy of Sciences and Arts
Academy of Fine Arts, University of Zagreb alumni
Yugoslav sculptors